Mukul Nag is an Indian actor. He is best known for playing the revered saint, Sai Baba of Shirdi, in the Hindi language historical drama series Sai Baba (TV series). The series was produced by Sagar Films and broadcast by Star Plus in 2008.

Early life
In an interview with Sai Leela Times, Mukul Nag said: "Papaji (Ramanand Sagar) asked me just one question before he cast me as Sai Baba in the serial. He asked me how you're planning to do this role? I replied I do my job with full Devotion (shraddha), and he said you're doing this role – I just want to know this."

Mukul Nag is one of the best actors of National School of Drama, India. He was born on 25 October in a small city of India. His first play, Taimoor or Balak, was directed and acted by himself at the time when he was just 12 years old. After finishing his studies, he started his course with National School of Drama. He then acted with Sagar Films in Shri Krishna as Sudama and Ashvatthama.

Mukul Nag has his own production house named Amita Nag Production.

He also played the role of Prabal Gupta in the episode Sahi ka Kanta for Byomkesh Bakshi (TV series) broadcast by Doordarshan in 1997.

Filmography

Films
Hazaar Chaurasi Ki Maa (1998)
Mast (1999) as Blacker
Company (2002) as Insp. Navlekar
Bhagat Singh (2002) as Chandrashekhar Azad
Gangajal (2003)
Satta (2003)
Apaharan (2005) as Usman
Phantom (2015)

Television

References

External links
 

Indian male film actors
Living people
1961 births